St John the Evangelist's Church, Darlington is a Grade II listed Church of England church on Neasham Road, Darlington, County Durham.

History

The church was designed by John Middleton and built between 1847 and 1849.

The church opened for worship on 3 January 1850.

The debt took some time to pay off, but by 1853 the Bishop of Durham agreed to consecrate the church and it took place on 16 July 1853.

The vestries were added in 1900 by W.S. HIcks.

Organ

Initially services were accompanied by a Seraphine. A pipe organ was presented in 1857 by Nathaniel Plews, which was second hand from Bedale church. However, this proved to be unsatisfactory and in 1865 a new organ was installed by Mr. Nicholson of Newcastle upon Tyne which included parts from the old organ. The cost was £150.

This organ was replaced in 1890 when a 2 manual organ was built by H.S. Vincent and Company of Sunderland. The opening recital was given on 18 September 1890 by Philip Armes, organist of Durham Cathedral. A specification of the current organ can be found on the National Pipe Organ Register. It has been awarded a Grade II* listing by the British Institute of Organ Studies.

Bells
The tower contains a ring of 8 bells. Five were installed in 1848 by Charles and George Mears. Three more were added in 1893 by Mears and Stainbank.

References

Church of England church buildings in County Durham
Grade II listed churches in County Durham
Churches in Darlington